Frederick Henry Smith, 1st Baron Colwyn  (24 January 1859 – 26 January 1946), known as Sir Frederick Smith, 1st Baronet, from 1912 to 1917, was a British manufacturer, investor and banking executive. He was an influential Liberal figure in Manchester politics for many years.

Smith was a rubber and cotton factory owner, deputy chairman of Martins Bank (which 23 years after his death with 700 branches was acquired by Barclays Bank) and a director of several railway companies. In 1917 he served as Sheriff of Caernarvonshire. He was created a Baronet, of Colwyn Bay in the County of Denbigh, in 1912. In the 1917 Birthday Honours he was raised to the peerage as Baron Colwyn, of Colwyn Bay in the County of Denbigh. In 1924, he was admitted to the Privy Council. He was also a president of Colwyn Bay Football Club.

Lord Colwyn married Elizabeth Anne, daughter of Hamilton Savage, in 1882. They had two sons and five daughters. She died in 1945. Colwyn died in January 1946, aged 87. His eldest son predeceased him, and the barony was inherited by Lord Colwyn's grandson Frederick.

See also
Colwyn committee

References

1859 births
1946 deaths
Barons in the Peerage of the United Kingdom
Smith, Frederick
High Sheriffs of Caernarvonshire
Members of the Privy Council of the United Kingdom
Barons created by George V
Deputy Lieutenants of Denbighshire
English justices of the peace
Welsh justices of the peace